Sinocyclocheilus mashanensis is a species of ray-finned fish in the genus Sinocyclocheilus.

References 

mashanensis
Fish described in 2010